Dr Gabriel Hemery (born 13 December 1968) is an English forest scientist (silvologist) and author.  He co-founded the Sylva Foundation with Sir Martin Wood, a tree and forestry charity established in 2009.

Career
He began his career at the Northmoor Trust, now named the Earth Trust, in Oxfordshire.  He later became Director of Development for the Botanical Society of Britain and Ireland, returning to forestry to establish the Forestry Horizons think-tank in 2006. He is currently Chief Executive of Sylva Foundation, which he co-founded with Sir Martin Wood in 2009.

He has played an active role in the Institute of Chartered Foresters where he is a Fellow.

During 2011, he co-founded the ginger group Our Forests with other prominent environmentalists, including Jonathon Porritt and Tony Juniper, to provide a voice for the people of England in the future of the country's public forests.

In 2022, he was elected Chair of the Forestry and Climate Change Partnership
 which exists to help Britain's trees, woods, and forests to be resilient and adapt to a changing climate.

With co-author Sarah Simblet he wrote a contemporary version of John Evelyn's Sylva - The New Sylva - published by Bloomsbury in April 2014.

He has written several fiction works including with Unbound Publishing Green Gold: The Epic True Story of Victorian Plant Hunter John Jeffrey; a biographical novel describing the true story of an expedition to North America by Victorian botanist John Jeffrey between 1850 and 1854. He has also written two short story collections and a poetry anthology.

He is currently working on a series of guidebooks to British forests published by Bloomsbury, the first of which will be "The Forest Guide: Scotland" coming April 2023.

Forestry research
He designed and established a new woodland and centre for hardwood forestry research; Paradise Wood.
He was a founding member of the British and Irish Hardwoods Improvement Programme establishing a number of forestry field trials across the UK and Ireland (e.g.). 
He gained a DPhil degree at the Department of Plant Sciences at the University of Oxford on the genetic improvement of walnut. His research took him to the walnut fruit forests of Kyrgyzstan where he collected thousands of Juglans regia seeds for field trials back in the UK. He then researched and published numerous articles pertaining to the silviculture (e.g.) and genetic improvement of walnut.
He initiated an agroforestry research project in the mid-1990s, combining free-range  broiler chicken with newly established woodland.

Books 
 Gabriel Hemery and Sarah Simblet — The New Sylva: a discourse of forest and orchard trees for the twenty-first century. 400pp. (Bloomsbury Publishing, 2014). .
 Gabriel Hemery  — Don't Look Back. in Adrian Cooper (ed)  — Arboreal: a collection of new woodland writing.  (Little Toller Books, 2016). .
 Gabriel Hemery  — Green Gold: The Epic True Story of Victorian Plant Hunter John Jeffrey. (Unbound Publishing, 2019). . 
 Gabriel Hemery  — Tall Trees Short Stories: Vol.20. (Wood Wide Works, 2020). . 
 Gabriel Hemery  — The Man Who Harvested Trees (and Gifted Life). in Fiona Stafford (ed)  — Stories of Trees, Woods and the Forest.  (Everyman's Library, 2021). .
 Gabriel Hemery  — Tall Trees Short Stories: Vol.21. (Wood Wide Works, 2021). .
 Gabriel Hemery  — The Wolf, The Walnut and the Woodsman. (Wood Wide Works, 2022). .
 Gabriel Hemery  — Blough: an Anthology of Tree and Nature Poems. (Wood Wide Works, 2022). .
 Gabriel Hemery  — The Forest Guide: Scotland. 320pp. (Bloomsbury Publishing, 2023). .

References

External links 
 Forestry Horizons
 Personal blog of Gabriel Hemery
 The Tree Photographer - a photo blog by Gabriel Hemery
 Gabriel Hemery's profile on GoodReads
 Walnut Thesis
 Institute of Chartered Foresters
 Sylva Foundation
 myForest Project

1968 births
English foresters
Living people
British environmentalists
Forestry researchers